Dauendorf is a commune in the Bas-Rhin department in Grand Est in north-eastern France.

It is the site of the remains of Neubourg Abbey, a former Cistercian monastery, destroyed during the French Revolution.

See also
 Communes of the Bas-Rhin department

References

Communes of Bas-Rhin
Bas-Rhin communes articles needing translation from French Wikipedia